The Fontana delle Anfore (English: Fountain of the Amphorae), located in Testaccio, a quarter of Rome, Italy. It was completed in 1927, by Pietro Lombardi after he won a competition the municipality of Rome set in 1924 for new local fountains. The motive of the amphorae refers to the Monte Testaccio and to the symbol of the whole quarter.

It was initially in Piazza Testaccio (at that time it was called Piazza Mastro Giorgio), but was moved to Piazza dell'Emporio in the mid-1930s. After the closure of the old Testaccio market in 2012, Piazza Testaccio was converted to an open space, reopening in January 2015, with the restored fountain again at its centre.

References

Thais:Roma-Fountains
Comune di Roma - Fontane e Ponti

Anfore
Rome R. XX Testaccio